Anderson Sebastião Cardoso or simply Chicão (born June 3, 1981), is a Brazilian former professional footballer who has played as a central defender for Corinthians, Flamengo and Delhi Dynamos.

Career
On August 3, 2013, Chicão joined Flamengo after leaving Corinthians

On 21 August 2015, he signed for Indian Super League franchise Delhi Dynamos.

Retirement
On 14 July 2016, Chicão announced his retirement from football.

Honours
Figueirense
Campeonato Catarinense: 2006

Corinthians
Campeonato Brasileiro Série B: 2008
Campeonato Paulista: 2009, 2013
Copa do Brasil: 2009
Campeonato Brasileiro Série A: 2011
Copa Libertadores: 2012
FIFA Club World Cup: 2012
Recopa Sudamericana: 2013

Flamengo
Copa do Brasil: 2013
Campeonato Carioca: 2014

Club statistics

External links 
 Guardian Stats Centre
 sambafoot
 CBF
 zerozero.pt
 football-lineups
 figueirense.com
 interfreire

References

1981 births
Living people
Brazilian footballers
Brazilian expatriate footballers
Expatriate footballers in India
Mogi Mirim Esporte Clube players
Associação Atlética Portuguesa (Santos) players
América Futebol Clube (SP) players
Esporte Clube Juventude players
Figueirense FC players
Sport Club Corinthians Paulista players
CR Flamengo footballers
Campeonato Brasileiro Série A players
Indian Super League players
Esporte Clube Bahia players
Odisha FC players
Association football defenders
People from Mogi Guaçu